The Ministry of Justice and Constitutional Affairs is a cabinet-level government ministry of Uganda. It is responsible for the provision of "legal advice and legal services to government, its allied institutions and to the general public and to support the machinery that provides the legal framework for good governance". The ministry is headed by a cabinet minister, currently Norbert Mao.

Location
The headquarters of the ministry are located at 1 Parliament Avenue, in the Central Division of Kampala, the capital and largest city of Uganda. The coordinates of the ministry headquarters are: 0°18'47.0"N, 32°35'10.0"E (Latitude:0.313056; Longitude:32.586111).

Constitutional mandate
The Ministry of Justice and Constitutional Affairs is empowered to carry out the following functions:

 To represent the government of Uganda in civil suits for and against the government
 To carry out legal advisory services, including the drafting, perusal and clearance of contracts and treaties. It also has the authority to provide legal opinion on government borrowing
 To draft bills and statutory instruments
 To regulate the legal profession and legal education
 To administer estates of the deceased, people with unsound minds and if missing persons
 To collect non-tax revenue

List of ministers (Independence in 1962-present)

Grace K. Ibingira (1962-1964) [1st Minister of Justice]
Cuthbert Joseph Obwangor (1964-1966)
 Peter James Nkambo Mugerwa  (1971-1973)
Godfrey Serunkuma Lule (1973-1977)
Dani Wadada Nabudere (1979)
 Edward Ogbal (1979-1986)
Joseph Mulenga (1986-1989)
George Kanyeihamba (1989-1990)
Abu Mayanja (1990-1994)
Joseph Ekemu (1994-1996)
 Bart Magunda Katureebe (1996-1998)
 Joshua S. Mayanja-Nkangi (1998-2001)
 Janat Mukwaya (2001-2003) [1st female]
Amama Mbabazi (2004-2006)
 Kiddu Makubuya (2005-2011)
 Kahinda Otafiire (2011- 2021)
 Norbert Mao (2022 - present)

See also

Cabinet of Uganda
Justice ministry
List of Ministers of Justice and Constitutional Affairs of Uganda
Parliament of Uganda
Politics of Uganda

References

External links
 Website of Ministry of Ministry of Justice and Constitutional Affairs (Uganda)

Government ministries of Uganda
Justice ministries
Constitutional affairs ministries